Fernando Villapol Parapar (born 26 February 1953 in San Tirso de Abres, Asturias Spain) is a museum curator and art critic, most famous as a contemporary Galician sculptor. He currently lives and works in the town of Bretoña (Lugo) located in Galicia. He is also the founder of the Ethnographic-Pedagogic Museum in Bretoña. He studied at the College of Applied Arts in Lugo, Spain, although can be considered an autodidact, attributing most of his knowledge and acquired skills through his self-funded travels and investigations of sculpture across the globe (e.g. Africa, Cuba, Canada, Denmark, France, Greece, Italy, Norway, Portugal, Sweden).

Materials of choice 
Villapol's sculptures embody a wide variety of materials, including but not limited to:

metal (iron, bronze)
wood (Galician common yew, oak, Spanish box tree, chestnut tree)
stone (marble, granite).

Artistic style 
Critics of Villapol's work often define his sculptures as one or combination of: realism, abstractism, and surrealism. The artist has been said to be inspired by works from Diego Velázquez, Urbano Lugrís, Eugenio Granell, and Salvador Dalí. More recently, critics have suggested that Villapol's style cannot be defined by any one of these labels but as a fusion of all three: REalism + ABstractism + SUrrealism. This has been recently stated by the artist himself:

Awards and distinctions 
 Arte de Meigas e Trasnos Prize (Sarria, Spain, 1990)
 Lugo Plastic Arts Award (Lugo, Spain, 1994 )
 Cangas do Morrazo Prize (Cangas, Spain, 2004–2006 )
 10th Burela Art Competition, awarded 1st prize in sculpture (Burela, Spain, 2005)
 Luarca Arts award (Luarca, Spain, 2006 )

Ethnographic-Pedagogic Museum 
The museum was founded and is curated by Villapol in 2002 houses a wide display of rural Galician culture and contemporary Galician art. The pieces from local folk history show the evolution of the various important trades in the district: clog maker, baker, carpenter, shoemaker, basket weaver, and farming. There are also education displays which show a typical Galician school, doctor's office, dentist's office, chemist as they were seen in the 19th century. Additionally, the museum contains original manuscripts by Otero Pedrayo, Vicente Risco, Bouza Brey, Antonio Fraguas, Iglesia Alvariño, Camilo García Trelles, González Garcés, and Castroviejo, as well as a wide collection of paintings from contemporary Galician artists: Urbano Lugrís, Laxeiro, Castrogil, Vilar Chao, Mariano Garcia Patiño and Mayor Balboa. Also, the museum also boasts a collection of over 2000 authentic Galician and Asturian soda syphon bottles.

Public collections 
 Provincial Museum of Lugo (Lugo, Spain)
 Ethnographic-Pedagogic Museum (Bretoña, Lugo, Spain)
 Museum of Fonsagrada (Lugo, Spain)

Selected solo exhibitions 
González Garcés Library (A Coruña, Spain)
Provincial Museum of Lugo (Lugo, Spain)
Museum of Fonsagrada (Fonsagrada, Lugo, Spain)
Ateneo of Ourense (Ourense, Spain)
Provincial Library of Lugo (Lugo, Spain)
Esmelgar Gallery
Almirante Gallery
Bacabú Gallery (Lugo, Spain)
Sargadelos Gallery (Vigo, Spain)
Eiros Gallery (Meira, Spain)
Solloso Gallery (Ribadeo, Spain)
Taramundi Cultural Center (Taramundi, Asturias, Spain)
A Guardia Cultural Center (Pontevedra, Spain)
San Tirso Cultural Center (San Tirso de Abres, Asturias, Spain)
Puerta II Gallery (Lugo, Spain)
Cangas do Morrazo Cultural Center (Pontevedra, Spain)
Grisolart Gallery ( Barcelona, Spain)
Magdalena Church in Rivadavia (Ourense, Spain)
University of Sek (Segovia, Spain)
Salnés Exhibition (Cambados, Pontevedra, Spain)
El Vendrell (Tarragona, Spain)
Vegadeo Cultural Center (Vegadeo, Asturias, Spain)
Burela Cultural Center (Burela, Lugo, Spain)
Alvaro Delgado de Luarca Gallery (Luarca, Asturias, Spain)
Cajastur Bank Exhibit (throughout Asturias, Spain)
Antique Museum (París, France)
Pazo Melgaso (Portugal)
Ribadeo Exhibition (Lugo)

References

External links 
 Fernando Villapol's website
 Ethnographic-Pedagogic Museum website

1953 births
Living people
20th-century sculptors
21st-century sculptors
Spanish sculptors
Spanish male sculptors
Sculptors from Galicia (Spain)
People from Asturias